Charles Vincent Morrissey (26 April 1903 – 20 February 1938) was a rugby union player who represented Australia.

Morrissey, a centre, was born in Singleton and claimed a total of 5 international rugby caps for Australia. He was the first captain of Wanderers RFC in Newcastle, NSW which was formed in 1925 having originally been established as GPS Old Boys in 1924.

He also played six first-class cricket matches for New South Wales between 1924/25 and 1925/26.

See also
 List of New South Wales representative cricketers

References

1903 births
1938 deaths
Australian rugby union players
Australia international rugby union players
Australian cricketers
New South Wales cricketers
Rugby union players from New South Wales
Rugby union centres